Mark Steven Murphy (born April 22, 1958 in Canton, Ohio) is a former American football safety in the National Football League. He was signed by the Green Bay Packers as an undrafted free agent in 1980. He played college football at West Liberty State College.

Murphy was inducted into the Green Bay Packers Hall of Fame in 1998.

Professional career
Murphy was signed by the Green Bay Packers as an undrafted free agent in 1980. He broke his wrist in that 1980 training camp, but not before impressing the coaches enough in scrimmages that he was put on the injured reserve list. While recovering from his injury, he studied and learned the safety position thoroughly.

When Johnnie Gray was injured in 1981, he started seven games at strong safety and nabbed the first three of his 20 lifetime interceptions.

In 1982 he returned to special teams duty as the team made the playoffs for the only time in Murphy’s career. When Gray was shifted to free safety in 1983, Murphy became a regular at strong safety and would remain there the rest of his career.

He was a steady player who hit with power, but lacked speed. His best years were those in which he played alongside fellow safety Chuck Cecil to form the toughest and hardest-hitting pair of safeties in the league.  They were a popular hard-hitting duo that made them popular with the fans.

Murphy led the team in tackles the last four years of his career.

He played for the Packers from 1980 to 1991, starting 122 of 147 games at both safety positions. He finished his career with 20 interceptions, 11 sacks, and a touchdown.

References

External links
Green Bay Packers bio

1958 births
Living people
American football safeties
Green Bay Packers players
West Liberty Hilltoppers football players
Players of American football from Canton, Ohio
Ed Block Courage Award recipients